Mexico competed at the 1980 Summer Olympics in Moscow, USSR. 45 competitors, 36 men and 9 women, took part in 43 events in 12 sports.

Medalists

Silver
 Carlos Girón — Diving, Men's Springboard

Bronze
 Joaquin Pérez — Equestrian, Jumping Individual (mixed)
 David Bárcena Ríos, Manuel Mendivil, José Pérez and Fabián Vázquez — Equestrian, Three-day Event Team Competition
 Jesús Gómez, Joaquin Pérez, Gerardo Tazzer and Alberto Valdés — Equestrian, Jumping Team Competition

Athletics

Men's 10,000 metres
 Enrique Aquino
 Heat — 29:21.3 (→ did not advance)

 Rodolfo Gómez
 Heat — 29:25.7 (→ did not advance)

 José Gómez
 Heat — 29:53.6 (→ did not advance)

Men's Marathon
 Rodolfo Gómez
 Final — 2:12:39 (→ 6th place)

Men's 20 km Walk
 Raúl González
 Final — 1:27:48.6 (→ 6th place)

Daniel Bautista
 Final — DSQ (→ no ranking)

Domingo Colín
 Final — DSQ (→ no ranking)

Men's 50 km Walk
 Raúl González
 Final — did not finish (→ no ranking)

Daniel Bautista
 Final — did not finish (→ no ranking)

Martín Bermúdez
 Final — did not finish (→ no ranking)

Boxing

Men's Light Flyweight (– 48 kg)
 Gilberto Sosa
 First Round — Defeated Vandui Bayasgalan (Mongolia) on points (4-1) 
 Second Round — Lost to Li Byong-Uk (North Korea) on points (2-3)

Men's Flyweight (– 51 kg)
 Roman Gilberto
 First Round — Bye
 Second Round — Defeated Alberto Mercado (Puerto Rico) after referee stopped contest in first round 
 Quarter Finals — Lost to Petar Lesov (Bulgaria) on points (1-4)

Men's Bantamweight (– 54 kg)
 Daniel Zaragoza
 First Round — Bye
 Second Round — Defeated Philip Sutcliffe (Ireland) on points (5-0)  
 Third Round — Defeated Raymond Gilbody (Great Britain) on points (4-1)  
 Quarter Finals — Lost to Michael Anthony (Guyana) after referee stopped contest in second round

Men's Featherweight (– 57 kg)
 Carlos González
 First Round — Defeated Nidal Haddad (Syria) on points (5-0)
 Second Round — Defeated Ravsal Otgonbayar (Mongolia) on points (3-2)
 Third Round — Lost to Rudi Fink (East Germany) after knock-out in first round

Diving

Men's Springboard
 Carlos Girón
 Heats — 580.20 points (→ 1st place)
 Final — 892.140 points (→  Silver Medal)

 Francisco Rueda
 Preliminary Round — 495.63 points (→ 14th place, did not advance)

 Jorge Mondragón
 Heats — 454.17 points (→ 20th place, did not advance)

Men's Platform
 Carlos Girón
 Heats — 515.37 points (→ 5th place)
 Final — 809.805 points (→ 4th place)

 Francisco Rueda
 Preliminary Round — 428.52 points (→ 15th place, did not advance)

 Salvador Sobrino
 Preliminary Round — 456.87 points (→ 11th place, did not advance)

Equestrian

Gymnastics

Judo

Modern pentathlon

Two male pentathletes represented Mexico in 1980.

Individual
 Ivar Sisniega
 Jens Lohmann

Rowing

Shooting

Swimming

Women's 100 m Breaststroke
Elke Holtz
 Heats — 1:15.89 (→ did not advance)

Women's 4 × 100 m Freestyle Relay
 Isabel Reuss, Dagmar Erdman, Teresa Rivera, and Helen Plachinski
 Heats — 3.56,87
 Final — 3.55,41 (→ 6th place)

Women's 4 × 100 m Medley Relay
 Teresa Rivera, Elke Holtz, Dagmar Erdman, and Helen Plachinski
 Heats — 4.25,95 (→ did not advance)

Weightlifting

Wrestling

Men's freestyle 48 kg
Jorge Frías
 Eliminated in Third Round

Men's Greco-Roman 48 kg
Alfredo Olvera
 Sixth place

References

Nations at the 1980 Summer Olympics
1980 Summer Olympics
1980 in Mexican sports